San Giuliano Milanese is a comune (municipality) in the Metropolitan City of Milan in the Italian region Lombardy, located about  southeast of Milan. It received the honorary title of city with a presidential decree on April 24, 2000.

The frazione of Viboldone is home to the  historical Abbey of Viboldone.

The town is served by the Borgolombardo and San Giuliano Milanese railway stations.

Twin towns - sister cities
San Giuliano Milanese is twinned with:
 Bussy-Saint-Georges, France, since 2001
 Curtea de Argeş, Romania, since 2003

References

External links
 Official website

Cities and towns in Lombardy